Luc Jouret (18 October 1947 – 5 October 1994), born in Kikwit, Belgian Congo, was a Belgian religious group leader in Switzerland. He co-founded the Parti Communautaire Européen with Jean Thiriart, a leading member of the euro-nationalist Jeune Europe Belgian group. Later, Jouret also founded the Order of the Solar Temple (also known as the Order of the Solar Tradition) with Joseph Di Mambro in 1984. He committed suicide in the Swiss village of Salvan in October 1994, leading to a mass suicide of his followers.

Biography 
Jouret was born on 18 October 1947 in what was then the Belgian Congo, Africa. His Belgian parents returned to their homeland in the 1950s, and Jouret attended the Free University of Brussels from which he received his medical degree. During his college years he joined the Walloon Communist Youth, which resulted in the police placing him under surveillance. He graduated with his medical degree in 1974. Two years after graduation, in 1976, he joined the Belgian Army and became a paratrooper. While in the army he participated in the Battle of Kolwezi, a joint French and Belgian airborne operation which resulted in the liberation of hostages from the city of Kolwezi.

Following his time in the army, he began a formal study of homeopathy and qualified as a homeopathic practitioner in France. He travelled widely studying various forms of alternative and spiritual healing; it is known that he visited the Philippines in 1977, and he later stated he had visited China, Peru, and India. At the beginning of the 1980s he settled in Annemasse, France, not far from the Swiss border, and began to practice homeopathy there. He continued to lecture widely on holistic health and the paranormal and invited those who responded to him into Amenta Club (later renamed the Atlanta Club).

Among the groups for which he lectured was the Golden Way Foundation, a New Age group in Geneva, Switzerland, and he became close friends with the foundation's leader, Joseph Di Mambro (1924–1994). Di Mambro had been a Rosicrucian and Jouret had in 1981 affiliated with the Renewed Order of the Temple, an occult order founded in the 1970s by Julian Origas (1920–1983). They soon discovered their mutual interests and in 1984 together founded the Solar Temple. By this time Jouret was traveling widely through French-speaking Europe, Eastern Canada and Martinique as an inspirational speaker. While Di Mambro directed the group from behind the scenes, Jouret was its outward image and primary recruiter.

The Solar Temple wedded the Templars tradition to the New Age. It drew its authority in part by an appeal to a lineage of grand masters that was claimed to go back to the medieval Order of the Temple that was suppressed at the beginning of the fourteenth century. Di Mambro assigned members a significant role as agents to bring the New Age into visible presence in the world. The temple offered a program of personal spiritual progress through the practice of occult disciplines and rituals that invoked the power of the Great White Brotherhood to bring forth the New Age.

Jouret led a growing organization through the 1980s, but in the 1990s, troubles began to plague the temple. Members began to depart, Di Mambro fell ill, and authorities in several countries began to investigate its activities. Jouret and Di Mambro became increasingly pessimistic, especially after Jouret was arrested for attempting to purchase three handguns with silencers in Quebec. The incident was widely reported in the media and destroyed his reputation in Quebec.

In 1993 Jouret, Di Mambro, and several members travelled to Australia. By this time they were beginning to discuss the refusal of the public to evolve and bring in the New Age. They began to put together a set of documents that would be mailed out in October 1994 detailing their rationale for their final act in which they would escape the world to a higher dimension. On 3–5 October 1994, Jouret and some 12 other members of the temple died by suicide at two locations in Switzerland. The night before he died, Jouret joined Di Mambro and a small group of members in a lavish last meal together at a local restaurant. Prior to their own death, the group assisted other members who had taken tranquilizers to die. These members were shot. The Solar Temple disbanded after Jouret's death, though a year later another group would commit suicide and in 1997 five more died believing that they were following the first group to a higher dimension. He died a fortnight before his 47th birthday.

References 

1947 births
1994 deaths
1994 suicides
Belgian expatriates in the Democratic Republic of the Congo
Belgian expatriates in Switzerland
Belgian fascists
Belgian homeopaths
Belgian religious leaders
Former Marxists
Members of the clergy convicted of crimes
Order of the Solar Temple
People from Kikwit
Suicides in Switzerland
Cult leaders